Zacharie Boucher (born 7 March 1992) is a French professional footballer who plays as a goalkeeper for Ligue 2 club Bastia. He was a French youth international and has served as the number one goalkeeper at under-16, under-17, and under-18 level.

Club career
Born in Saint-Pierre, Réunion, Boucher began his professional career at Le Havre. For the 2010–11 season, he was installed as the club's third goalkeeper behind starter Mike Van Hamel and backup Johny Placide. He made his professional debut on 29 July 2011 in a 2–1 win over Istres appearing as a substitute for starting goalkeeper Placide in the first half.

After being voted the Best Goalkeeper in Ligue 2 for 2013, Boucher signed with Ligue 1 outfit, Toulouse in the 2013–14 winter transfer window. He quickly displaced Comorian international, Ali Ahamada, and with a series of excellent displays, helped the club to a credible 9th-place finish. The 2014–15 season did not go as well as his first, with him losing his starting place and having to share goalkeeping duties, where the club only narrowly avoided relegation as they finished in 17th place.

In July 2015, Boucher decided against staying at Toulouse and transferred to Ligue 2 club Auxerre, where he would be the undisputed first choice goalkeeper. He expressed his desire to one day return to the top flight, of which he knew he was capable of playing in, but believed remaining at Auxerre for the near future would be more beneficial for his development.

At the beginning of the 2018–19 season, he lost his starting place at Auxerre to Quentin Westberg (in the league) and Sonny Laiton (in the Coupe de la Ligue.

On 31 August 2018, the last day of the 2018 summer transfer window, Boucher joined Ligue 1 side Angers on loan for the season.

On 9 September 2020, he signed a two-year contract with Aris.

On 12 June 2021, Aris announced that Boucher had been released. On 11 January 2022, he signed for Ligue 2 club Bastia until the end of the 2021–22 season.

International career
Born in Réunion, Boucher is of Malagasy descent and was approached to join the Madagascar national team in March 2018. He is a youth international for France.

Career statistics

Honours
Individual
 Toulon Tournament Best Goalkeeper: 2013
 Ligue 2 Goalkeeper of the Year: 2012–13

References

External links
 Zacharie Boucher club profile
 
 
 

1992 births
Living people
French sportspeople of Malagasy descent
Footballers from Réunion
French footballers
Association football goalkeepers
France youth international footballers
France under-21 international footballers
Le Havre AC players
Toulouse FC players
AJ Auxerre players
Angers SCO players
Aris Thessaloniki F.C. players
SC Bastia players
Ligue 1 players
Ligue 2 players
Super League Greece players
French expatriate footballers
French expatriate sportspeople in Greece
Expatriate footballers in Greece
Black French sportspeople